Mekel can refer to:

People

Aryeh Mekel, Israeli diplomat and journalist 
Gal Mekel (born 1988), Israeli NBA basketball player 
Once Mekel (born 1970), Indonesian singer